Sing It Now: Songs of Faith & Hope is the thirty-first  studio album by American country music singer Reba McEntire. It was released on February 3, 2017, by Rockin' R Records, Nash Icon, Big Machine Records and Capitol Christian Music Group. McEntire produced the album with her musical director Doug Sisemore and Jay DeMarcus from the musical group Rascal Flatts. The album consists of two discs. The first disc is made up of traditional hymns, while the second disc contains all original songs. McEntire wrote a song on the album "I Got the Lord on My Side" with the help of her mother, Jackie McEntire.

Background
While McEntire is most known for her work in country music, she has stated that she has wanted to do a gospel album since the mid-1980s. She recorded the album in the wake of her divorce from Narvel Blackstock in 2015, which she said led her faith to become stronger.

Release and promotion
McEntire announced the album on December 15, 2016, during a live Facebook chat. During the chat she also announced that to promote the album she would perform a one-night-only show at the Ryman Auditorium on February 15, 2017. Following the announcement, the first single from the album, "Softly and Tenderly", featuring Kelly Clarkson and Trisha Yearwood, was released on December 16, along with the album's pre-order. In the weeks leading up to the album's release, a new song was released each Friday. "Hallelujah, Amen" was released as the first promotional single on December 23. The second promotional single, "Oh, How I Love Jesus", was released on December 30. The third promotional single, "God and My Girlfriends", was released on January 6, 2017. "Oh Happy Day" was released as the fourth promotional single on January 13. The album's second single, "Back to God", was released on January 20. The music video for the single "Back to God" was released on January 24, 2017. The fifth and final promotional single, "Sing It Now", was released on January 27. In November 2017, "God and My Girlfriends" was sent to radio as the third and final single from the album.

Critical reception

The album received mostly positive reviews from music critics. Stephen Thomas Erlewine for AllMusic said, "All of the ten new songs are very much creatures of their time -- big, glossy productions within the praise and worship mode. In contrast, the ten standards -- while still plenty polished -- are a bit rootsier. Each album is satisfying on its own, but when heard in conjunction, the range and subtle skill of McEntire impress." Andy Argyrakis of CCM Magazine gave to album 5 out of 5 stars, saying, "McEntire co-produces the entire spread alongside Rascal Flatts’ Jay DeMarcus and her band leader/musical director Doug Sisemore, resulting in a sound that straddles southern gospel, classic country, pop and contemporary Christian with a message that boldly lives up to its title on literally every single stirring occasion." My Kind of Country gave the album an A−, praising McEntire's decision to record a gospel album, "Sing It Now shows that when she puts aside commercial considerations and works with good material, she is still second to none." Today's Christian Entertainment gave the album 4.5 out of 5 stars, saying, "Complete with Reba’s signature style and sound, Sing It Now: Songs of Faith & Hope inspires with music that speaks to the hearts of listeners while keeping the attention on the love and grace of our Heavenly Father." Sounds Like Nashville proclaimed that "Sing It Now" made for a perfect segue from the standards to the newer material.

Awards and accolades
On August 9, 2017, it was announced that Sing It Now: Songs of Faith & Hope would be nominated for a GMA Dove Award for Worship Album of the Year at the 48th Annual GMA Dove Awards.

McEnitre was nominated for the Female Vocalist of the Year Award at the 51st CMA Awards on the strength of the album.

On October 17, 2017, Sing It Now: Songs of Faith & Hope won the GMA Dove Award for Bluegrass/Country/Roots Album of the Year with producers Reba McEntire, Jay DeMarcus and Doug Sisemore being the receipts at a ceremony at Allen Arena in Nashville, Tennessee.

The album also won Best Roots Gospel Album at the 60th Annual Grammy Awards.

Commercial performance
The album debuted at No. 1 on the Top Country Albums chart with 52,000 copies sold in the United States its first week of release. It also debuted at No. 4 on the Billboard 200 based on 54,000 units, which include stream and track sales. It has sold 216,800 copies in the US as of April 2018.

Track listing

Personnel 
 Reba McEntire – lead vocals, arrangements (1, 3, 5, 6, 8), backing vocals (6)
 Gordon Mote – acoustic piano (1, 9, 11-16, 18, 20, 21, 22), electric piano (16)
 Doug Sisemore – keyboards (1, 9, 10, 12, 14, 16, 19, 22), arrangements (3, 5, 6, 8, 9, 10), organ (5), Hammond B3 organ (8, 10, 13, 14, 16, 17, 22), programming (12, 19)
 Tim Akers – keyboards (2, 4, 7), arrangements (2, 4, 7), horn arrangements (4, 18), acoustic piano (10)
 Casey Brown – programming (2)
 Catherine Marx – acoustic piano (3, 8, 17, 19), arrangements (3)
 Dave Cohen – keyboards (11, 15, 18, 20, 21)
 Charles Judge – synthesizers (11, 15, 21), strings (11, 15, 21)
 Jim Kimball – acoustic guitar (1, 5, 6, 8, 9, 12, 13, 14, 16, 17, 19, 22), backing vocals (3)
 Danny Rader – acoustic guitar (2, 4, 7, 10)
 Ilya Toshinsky – acoustic guitar (11, 15, 18, 20, 21)
 Jeff King – electric guitar (1, 8, 9, 12, 13, 14, 16, 17, 19, 22)
 Jerry McPherson – electric guitar (2, 4, 7, 10)
 Derek Wells – electric guitar (2, 7, 11, 15, 18, 20, 21)
 Jay DeMarcus – additional guitar (2, 18, 21), arrangements (2, 4, 7), additional keyboards (20)
 Rob McNelly – electric guitar (11, 15, 18, 20, 21)
 Dan Dugmore – steel guitar (2, 4, 7)
 Mike Johnson – dobro (5, 6, 16), pedalboard (6), steel guitar (8, 13, 14, 17, 19, 22), lap steel guitar (12, 16)
 Travis Toy – steel guitar (11, 15, 20, 21)
 Jimmy Mattingly – mandolin (6, 13), violin (6), fiddle (16)
 Sonya Isaacs – mandolin (7)
 Mark Hill – bass (1, 8, 9, 12, 13, 14, 16, 17, 19, 22)
 Joey Canaday – bass (2, 4, 7, 10)
 Jimmie Lee Sloas – bass (11, 15, 18, 20, 21)
 Lonnie Wilson – drums (1, 9, 12, 13, 14, 16), programming (12, 14)
 Greg Morrow – drums (2, 4, 7, 10)
 Miles McPherson – drums (8, 11, 15, 17-21)
 Jenee Fleenor – fiddle (2, 7)
 Mark Douthit – saxophone (4, 18)
 Doug Moffett – saxophone (4, 18)
 Barry Green – trombone (4, 18)
 Mike Haynes – trumpet (4, 18)
 Steve Patrick – trumpet (4, 18)
 Tabitha Fair – backing vocals (2, 4, 18)
 Kim Keyes – backing vocals (2, 4, 18)
 Vicki Hampton – backing vocals (2, 4, 5, 8, 12, 14, 16, 18)
 Jimmy Stewart – backing vocals (3, 17)
 Jenifer Wrinkle Thompson – backing vocals (3, 12, 13, 17, 22)
 Bob Bailey – backing vocals (5, 8, 12, 14, 16)
 Wendy Moten – backing vocals (5, 8, 12, 14, 16)
 Alice Foran – backing vocals (6)
 Jackie McEntire – backing vocals (6)
 Susie McEntire – backing vocals (6)
 The Isaacs – backing vocals (7)
 Kelly Clarkson – lead and harmony vocals (10)
 Trisha Yearwood – lead and harmony vocals (10)
 Chip Davis – backing vocals (11, 15, 20, 21)
 Perry Coleman – backing vocals (13, 22)
 Cheri Oakley – backing vocals (20, 21)

Production 
 Reba McEntire – producer 
 Doug Sisemore – producer (1, 3, 5, 6, 8, 9, 10, 12, 13, 14, 16, 17, 19, 22), production coordinator (1, 3, 5, 6, 8, 9, 10, 12, 13, 14, 16, 17, 19, 22)
 Jay DeMarcus – producer (2, 4, 7, 11, 15, 18, 20, 21)
 Mike "Frog" Griffith – production coordinator (2, 4, 7, 11, 15, 18, 20, 21)
 Laurel Kittleson – production coordinator (2, 4, 7, 11, 15, 18, 20, 21)
 Janice Soled – production coordinator (2, 4, 7, 11, 15, 18, 20, 21)
 Brianna Steinitz – production coordinator (2, 4, 7, 11, 15, 18, 20, 21)
 Allison Jones – A&R 
 Todd Tidwell – recording (1, 3, 5, 6, 8, 9, 10, 12, 13, 14, 16, 17, 19, 22), recording assistant (2, 4, 7, 11, 15, 18, 20, 21)
 Sean Neff – mixing (1, 3, 5, 6, 8, 9, 10, 12, 13, 14, 16, 17, 19, 22), recording (2, 4, 7, 11, 15, 18, 20, 21)
 Derek Bason – recording (2, 4, 7, 11, 15, 18, 20, 21), mixing (2, 4, 7, 11, 15, 18, 20, 21)
 Jim Kimball – recording (17, 19), mixing (19)
 Chris Ashburn – recording assistant (1, 3, 5, 6, 8, 9, 10, 12, 13, 14, 16, 17, 19, 22)
 Nick Lane – mix assistant (1, 3, 5, 6, 8, 9, 10, 12, 13, 14, 16, 17, 19, 22), recording assistant (2, 4, 7, 11, 15, 18, 20, 21)
 Chris Small – mix assistant (2, 4, 7, 11, 15, 18, 20, 21)
 Chris Lord-Alge – mixing (17)
 Adam Ayan – mastering 
 Taylor Colson Horton – art direction, design 
 Justin McIntosh – art direction, design 
 Cameron Powell – photography

Studios 
 Recorded at Starstruck Studios, Hot Closet and The Grip (Nashville, TN).
 Mixed at Starstruck Studios and Hot Closet (Nashville, TN); SPIN Productions (Brentwood, TN); Mix LA (Tarzana, CA).
 Mastered at Gateway Mastering (Portland, ME).

Charts

Weekly

Year-end

References

2017 albums
Reba McEntire albums
Big Machine Records albums
Capitol Records albums
Albums produced by Jay DeMarcus
Grammy Award for Best Roots Gospel Album